"It Ain't Cool to Be Crazy About You" is a song written by Dean Dillon and Royce Porter, and recorded by American country music artist George Strait.  It was released in August 1986 as the second and final single from his album #7. "It Ain't Cool to Be Crazy About You" was his 9th #1 single.

Content
The narrator is a man who laid it all out on the line for the girl of his dreams. He got burned and made into a fool when she left him. Even when his friends tried to tell him he couldn’t listen.

Critical reception
Leeann Ward of Country Universe gave the song an A grade, saying that "hearing the first strains of the simple piano intro makes it almost impossible to get the tune out of your head once it’s there." She goes on to say that Strait’s "delivery of a mix of sadness and regret, with a hint of frustration, turns this song into something substantive with a relatable scenario."

Cover version
Kenny Chesney has recorded a version of this song. It was only available as a B-side for his "Never Wanted Nothing More" in 2007.

Charts
"It Ain't Cool" reached number 1 on the Billboard Hot Country Songs chart and number 5 on the Canadian RPM Country Tracks chart.

Weekly charts

Year-end charts

References

1986 singles
George Strait songs
Songs written by Dean Dillon
Song recordings produced by Jimmy Bowen
MCA Records singles
1986 songs
Songs written by Royce Porter